USS Long Island (CVE-1) (originally AVG-1 and then ACV-1) was lead ship of her class and the first escort carrier of the United States Navy. She was also the second ship to be named after Long Island, New York.

Construction and commissioning
Long Island was laid down on 7 July 1939, as the C-3 cargo liner Mormacmail, under Maritime Commission contract, by the Sun Shipbuilding and Drydock Company, Chester, Pennsylvania as Yard No 185, launched on 11 January 1940, sponsored by Ms. Dian B. Holt, acquired by the Navy on 6 March 1941, and commissioned on 2 June 1941 as Long Island (AVG-1), Commander Donald B. Duncan in command.

Service history

World War II
In the tense months before the attack on Pearl Harbor, Long Island operated out of Norfolk, Virginia, conducting experiments to prove the feasibility of aircraft operations from converted cargo ships. The data gathered by her crew greatly improved the combat readiness of later "baby flattops". Just after the Japanese attack, she escorted a convoy to Newfoundland and qualified carrier pilots at Norfolk before departing for the West Coast on 10 May 1942. Reaching San Francisco on 5 June, the ship immediately joined Admiral William S. Pye's Task Force One (TF 1); consisting of seven battleships and provided air cover while at sea to protect the West Coast of the United States and reinforce Admiral Chester Nimitz's forces before, during and after their victory in the Battle of Midway. She left the formation on 17 June and returned to the West Coast to resume carrier pilot training.

Long Island departed San Diego on 8 July and arrived Pearl Harbor on 17 July. After a training run south to Palmyra Island, she loaded two squadrons of Marine Corps aircraft and got underway for the South Pacific on 2 August. These planes, the first to reach Henderson Field, were instrumental in the Guadalcanal campaign and went on to compile a distinguished war record. Her mission was accomplished. Reclassified ACV-1 on 20 August, Long Island sailed for Vila, Efate Island, New Hebrides, and arrived on 17 August. She departed on 18 August but returned to Vila, on Efate, from 23 August to 31 August. She sailed on 1 September for Espiritu Santo, before departing from there the same day for San Diego.

Long Islands actions at Guadalcanal are mentioned and seen in the movie Flying Leathernecks.

Long Island returned to the West Coast on 20 September, as the new "baby flattops" took up the slack in the Pacific war zones. For the next year, the escort carrier trained carrier pilots at San Diego. Long Island was reclassified CVE-1 on 15 July 1943. In 1944–1945, she transported airplanes and their crews from the West Coast to various outposts in the Pacific. After V-J Day, she revisited many of these same bases while transporting soldiers and sailors back home during Operation Magic Carpet.

Post-war

Long Island decommissioned on 26 March 1946 at Puget Sound Naval Shipyard. Struck from the Naval Vessel Register on 12 April, she was sold to Zidell Ship Dismantling Company of Portland, Oregon on 24 April 1947 for scrapping. However, on 12 March 1948, she was acquired by the Canada-Europe Line for conversion to merchant service. Upon completion of conversion in 1949, she was renamed Nelly, and served as an immigrant carrier between Europe, Australia and Canada. In 1953, she was renamed Seven Seas. In 1955, she was chartered to the German Europe-Canada Line. On 17 July 1965, she had a serious fire and was towed to St John's, Newfoundland. She was repaired and started her last voyage on 13 September 1966. She was bought the same year and employed by Rotterdam University as a students' hostel until 1971 and as a migrant hostel until 1977, when she was scrapped in Belgium.

Awards
Long Island received one battle star for her World War II service.

Notes

References

External links

USS Long Island (CVE-1) Association homepage
Navy photographs of Long Island
The Ships List
Europe Canada Line Brochure 1957
https://ssmaritime.com/sevenseas.htm

Long Island-class escort carriers
Type C3 ships of the United States Navy
1940 ships
Ships built by the Sun Shipbuilding & Drydock Company
World War II escort aircraft carriers of the United States
Dormitory ships